Carabus sylvestris redtenbacheri is a subspecies of beetle in the family Carabidae that is endemic to Austria.

References

sylvestris redtenbacheri
Beetles described in 1876
Endemic fauna of Austria